Cythna is a genus of achilid planthoppers in the family Achilidae. There are at least three described species in Cythna.

Species
These three species belong to the genus Cythna:
 Cythna fusca Muir, 1927 c g
 Cythna glabra Haupt, 1926 c g
 Cythna laon Kirkaldy, 1906 c g
Data sources: i = ITIS, c = Catalogue of Life, g = GBIF, b = Bugguide.net

References

Further reading

 
 
 
 
 

Achilidae
Auchenorrhyncha genera